David Luther Burgess MC MBE (January 28, 1891 – November 30, 1960) was a World War I flying ace who, in 1926, was the sole challenger to Liberal Prime Minister William Lyon Mackenzie King in a by-election held in Prince Albert, Saskatchewan.

Biography 
Born in Kleinburg, Ontario, Burgess moved to Saskatchewan and became a farmer. He enlisted in the Saskatchewan Regiment during World War I and held the rank of lieutenant. In 1917, he was seconded to the Royal Flying Corps as an observer/gunner with No. 25 Squadron flying the DH-4 bomber from May to October 1917. In conjunction with his pilot Capt. James Fitz-Morris, the duo scored seven victories (4 destroyed, 3 'out of control') and was awarded the Military Cross for "conspicuous gallantry and devotion to duty in aerial fighting and on photography".

Mackenzie King had suffered a personal defeat in the 1925 federal election losing his riding of York North in Ontario and needed to win in a by-election in order to re-enter the House of Commons of Canada. Prince Albert Liberal MP Charles McDonald was persuaded to step aside in order to create a vacancy for King.

The Prince Albert by-election would normally have been a formality and the Conservative Party declined to enter a candidate as did the Progressives. However, an acclamation was avoided when Burgess entered the contest with the encouragement of the previous Tory candidate John Diefenbaker.

Burgess ran as an independent candidate and argued that Mackenzie King was appropriating the riding of Prince Albert and assuming the compliance of its residents. In an election address, he said:

Burgess was defeated in the February 15, 1926, by-election by a three-to-one margin.

Four years later, after the 1930 federal election defeated Mackenzie King's government and brought the Conservatives to power, Burgess moved to Ottawa to take up a position as private secretary to the new Minister of Agriculture, Robert Weir. He remained in Ottawa as a civil servant with the Department of Agriculture after the Conservatives were defeated in 1935 and retired from the position of chief of supplies of the department in 1957.

In 1956, he was elected Dominion president of the Canadian Legion and served in that position for four years.

He was a candidate for the city of Ottawa's Board of Control when he suffered a heart attack and died five days before the election.

References

1891 births
1960 deaths
Canadian World War I flying aces
Canadian recipients of the Military Cross
Saskatchewan candidates for Member of Parliament
Independent candidates for the Canadian House of Commons
Politicians from Prince Albert, Saskatchewan
People from Vaughan
20th-century Canadian politicians
Royal Flying Corps officers